Primovula tropica is a species of sea snail, a marine gastropod mollusk in the family Ovulidae: the ovulids, cowry allies, or false cowries.

References

Ovulidae
Gastropods described in 1931